Lukino is a rural locality (a village) in Kargopolsky District, Arkhangelsk Oblast, Russia. The population was 210 as of 2012.

References 

Rural localities in Kargopolsky District